Carlos Rojas may refer to:

 Carlos Rojas (footballer) (born 1928), Chilean football midfielder
 Carlos Rojas (sinologist) (born 1970), American sinologist and translator
 Carlos Rojas Gutiérrez (born 1954), Mexican politician
 Carlos Rojas Pavez (1906–1994), mayor of the commune of Pichilemu, Chile
 Carlos Rojas Vila (1928–2020), Spanish author, academic, and artist